Rave & Roses is the debut studio album by Nigerian singer Rema. It was released on 25 March 2022 via Jonzing World and Mavin Records. The album included guest appearances from 6lack, Chris Brown, AJ Tracey, and Yseult.

Background
In May 2021, Rema announced he would be calling his sound "Afrorave", a subgenre of Afrobeats with influences of Arabian and Indian music, saying "my album seals this claim for good". In an interview, Rema discussed the importance of the album to him saying "breath of fresh air for him as an artist."

Recording and production
Rema recorded the majority of the album in Benin City. He told NME about the recording process saying, "I tapped into a different mind space for this album, though. Learning through personal experiences, I knew I had been pushed into a different space compared to where I was before. As I'm currently at the forefront of a musical generation, I know the album is going to have an impact."

Singles and promotion
On 10 June 2021, Rema released the first single titled "Soundgasm", with a music video. On 11 February 2022, Rema officially announced the album's release date and released the second single "Calm Down". On 11 March 2022, he released the third single "FYN" featuring AJ Tracey.

Critical reception 

Jessica Kariisa of Pitchfork stated that "Rema sounds just as confident and irrepressibly youthful as ever". Motolani Alake of Pulse Nigeria gave the album a 7.2/10 but said that the album has unmissable flaws and there is evidence of lazy songwriting. Olayiide Bolaji of The Scoove Africa also gave the album a 7.2/10 but noted that while the album shows Rema's artistic evolution, it is predictable and most of the songs sound too alike.

Track listing

Charts

Weekly charts

Year-end charts

References

2022 debut albums
Albums produced by Sarz